Tuban, Kuta is a village in Badung Regency, Bali, Indonesia. It is served by Ngurah Rai International Airport, with Kelan bordering south. Kelan is a part of Tuban subdistricts, Kuta Subdistrict, Badung, Bali. Tuban is bordering north to Kuta, bordering east to Benoa Port, bordering south to Jimbaran and bordering west to the Indian Ocean.

Time zone
Central Indonesia Standard Time (UTC+08:00)

References

Populated places in Bali